Waiawa station (also known as Pearl Highlands station) is an under construction Honolulu Rail Transit station in Waimalu, Hawaii, serving Pearl Highlands Center. When completed, it is anticipated to have 1600 park and ride spaces.

The Hawaiian Station Name Working Group proposed Hawaiian names for the nine rail stations on the Ewa end of the rail system (stations west of and including Aloha Stadium) in November 2017, and HART adopted the proposed names on February 22, 2018. Waiawa means "milkfish water" and refers to an ahupuaʻa with the largest watershed on the island of Oʻahu.

References

External links
 

Honolulu Rail Transit stations
Railway stations scheduled to open in 2023